Portland is a 1996 Danish drama film written and directed by Niels Arden Oplev, in his feature film debut. It stars Anders W. Berthelsen, Ulrich Thomsen, and Iben Hjejle. The film, whose title is a reference to a Danish brand of cement, was selected for competition at the 46th Berlin International Film Festival.

Plot
The film is set in northern Denmark and depicts the "violent drug-fueled adventures of two brothers, Janus (Anders Wodskou Berthelsen) and Jakob (Michael Muller) at the bottom of Denmark's social ladder."

Cast
 Anders W. Berthelsen as Janus
 Michael Muller as Jakob, the brother of Janus
 Ulrich Thomsen as Lasse, the gang leader
 Iben Hjejle as Eva, the sister of Lasse
 Birthe Neumann as Lasse's mother
 Baard Owe as Kaj
 Edith Thrane as Mrs. Eriksen
 Helle Dolleris as Irene
 Susanne Birkemose Kongsgaard as Minna
 Karsten Belsnæs as Kenneth
 Preben Raunsbjerg as Johnny

Reception
Stephen Holden called the film "blood-chilling" with the "feel of a nihilistic prank. But although flashy, it has fundamental weaknesses. Partly because the actor playing him has no dramatic range, the transformation of Jakob from softhearted reform-school punk into sadistic iron man isn't the slightest bit convincing. Mr. Berthelsen's lank-haired, pill-popping Janus, however, is all too real. As this connoisseur of pain punches and lurches his way through the film, you see exactly how antisocial impulses can be warped into a code of outlaw values."

David Stratton called it "violent, nihilistic and often repellent, and yet its bold visuals and unexpected elements of humor and romance make it riveting viewing." According to Stratton, "as a director, Oplev shows he has talent: his mixture of moods works well, he gets strong performances from most cast members, and he pushes the narrative along at an urgent pace....But as a writer, he’s less successful; it’s surely not enough these days for Janus to blame his lifestyle on a lack of mother's love (which he does) or to have characters utter corny lines like “It’s us against the world.” There’s also far too much unmotivated violence (Janus assaulting a shopping mall security guard is a totally unnecessary sequence) and a few cheap and obvious jokes at the expense of authority figures."

References

External links

1996 films
1996 crime drama films
Danish crime drama films
1990s Danish-language films
Films directed by Niels Arden Oplev
Nihilist works
Zentropa films
Films set in Denmark
1996 directorial debut films
Films produced by Peter Aalbæk Jensen